Carouxella is a genus of fungi in the Harpellaceae family. The genus contains two species that grow in Diptera.

References

External links

Zygomycota genera